Main page: List of Canadian plants by family

Families:
A | B | C | D | E | F | G | H | I J K | L | M | N | O | P Q | R | S | T | U V W | X Y Z

Magnoliaceae 

 Liriodendron tulipifera — tulip-tree
 Magnolia acuminata — cucumber magnolia

Malvaceae 

 Hibiscus moscheutos — swamp rosemallow
 Iliamna rivularis — streambank globemallow
 Sida hermaphrodita — Virginia mallow
 Sidalcea campestris — meadow checkermallow
 Sidalcea hendersonii — Henderson's checkermallow
 Sidalcea oregana — Oregon checkermallow
 Sphaeralcea coccinea — red globemallow
 Sphaeralcea munroana — whitestem globemallow

Marchantiaceae 

 Bucegia romanica
 Marchantia alpestris
 Marchantia polymorpha
 Preissia quadrata

Marsileaceae 

 Marsilea vestita — hairy water fern

Meesiaceae 

 Amblyodon dealbatus
 Meesia longiseta
 Meesia triquetra
 Meesia uliginosa
 Paludella squarrosa

Melastomataceae 

 Rhexia virginica — Virginia meadowbeauty

Menispermaceae 

 Menispermum canadense — Canada moonseed

Menyanthaceae 

 Fauria crista-galli — deer-cabbage
 Menyanthes trifoliata — bog buckbean
 Nymphoides cordata — little floatingheart

Metzgeriaceae 

 Apometzgeria pubescens
 Metzgeria conjugata
 Metzgeria furcata
 Metzgeria myriopoda

Mniaceae 

 Cinclidium arcticum
 Cinclidium latifolium
 Cinclidium stygium
 Cinclidium subrotundum
 Cyrtomnium hymenophylloides
 Cyrtomnium hymenophyllum
 Leucolepis acanthoneuron
 Mnium ambiguum
 Mnium arizonicum
 Mnium blyttii
 Mnium hornum
 Mnium marginatum — olive-green calcareous moss
 Mnium spinulosum
 Mnium stellare
 Mnium thomsonii
 Plagiomnium ciliare
 Plagiomnium cuspidatum — toothed plagiomnium moss
 Plagiomnium drummondii
 Plagiomnium ellipticum
 Plagiomnium insigne
 Plagiomnium medium
 Plagiomnium rostratum
 Plagiomnium venustum
 Pseudobryum cinclidioides
 Rhizomnium andrewsianum
 Rhizomnium appalachianum — Appalachian rhizomnium moss
 Rhizomnium glabrescens
 Rhizomnium gracile
 Rhizomnium magnifolium — grandleaf rhizomnium moss
 Rhizomnium nudum
 Rhizomnium pseudopunctatum — felt round moss
 Rhizomnium punctatum — rhizomnium moss

Molluginaceae 

 Mollugo verticillata — green carpetweed

Monotropaceae 

 Allotropa virgata — sugarstick
 Hemitomes congestum — gnome-plant
 Monotropa hypopithys — American pinesap
 Monotropa uniflora — Indian-pipe
 Pleuricospora fimbriolata — fringed pinesap
 Pterospora andromedea — giant pinedrops

Moraceae 

 Morus rubra — red mulberry

Myricaceae 

 Comptonia peregrina — sweet-fern
 Morella californica — California bayberry
 Morella pensylvanica — northern bayberry
 Myrica gale — sweet gale

Myriniaceae 

 Myrinia pulvinata
 Schwetschkeopsis fabronia

Canada,family,M